Carl Giesecke (2 September 1812 – 28 September 1888) was a German organ builder who became known as a supplier of reed pipes.

Life and work 
Born in Göttingen, Giesecke was the son of the clothier Otto Heinrich Giesecke and Marie Caroline Aue. His grandfather and great-grandfather were surgeons in Schoningen.

Giesecke learned organ building from 1840 to 1844 from Johann Friedrich Schulze, on whose style he oriented himself structurally and tonally. On 1 April 1844, he acquired citizenship in Göttingen, set up his own business there and was soon one of the most important organ builders in southern Lower Saxony. He initially supplied Schulze with reed stops and other organ parts. By 1860, the workshop had attained a leading position as a subcontractor and from 1870 onwards supplied reeds and organ parts exclusively. Until 1869, he created over 20 new buildings.

On 28 July 1844 he married Wilhelmine Rosine Charlotte Schulz from Hameln, with whom he had six children. His son Hermann (11 May 1847 in Göttingen - 12 February 1928 ibid) was also an organ builder and partner of his father shortly after 1880. According to a contractual agreement, the company traded as "Carl Giesecke & Sohn" from 1884. Hermann took over the construction of the reeds from then on, while his father only made mechanical parts. In view of the growing demand for reeds, the building of complete organs was abandoned.

Since Hermann had no male descendants, the company was leased in 1909 to Adolf Hammer, the co-owner of the  company. Hermann's two daughters Helene Giesecke and Gertrud Steggewentz became partners and the company was named "Gieseckes Erben und W. Furtwängler". The number of employees grew to over 75 after the Second World War. In 2006, the company was transformed into a limited liability company. Continuing the company tradition, about 25 employees supplied organ builders worldwide with reed and labial pipes. In 2012, the company filed for insolvency, as a result of which the workshop was dissolved and business operations ceased.

List of works (selection) 
The size of the instruments is indicated in the fifth column by the number of manuals and the number of sounding stops in the sixth column. A capital "P" stands for an independent pedal, a small "p" for an attached pedal. Italicisation indicates that the organ in question is no longer preserved or that only the casing is preserved.

References

Further reading 
 
 
 Wilhelm Furtwängler: Carl Giesecke & Sohn GmbH, Göttingen, Prov. Hannover, Fabrik aller Orgel-Zungenstimmen. Göttingen 1928.
 Uwe Pape: Giesecke, Familie. In Die Musik in Geschichte und Gegenwart. Personenteil, Band 7. Kassel, Bärenreiter 2002, Sp. 930–931.
 Klaus Wilhelm Furtwängler, Angelika Hesse: Zungenstimmen. Giesecke + Sohn 1997 (PDF-Datei; 7,35 MB).
 Uwe Pape: Carl Giesecke – Orgelbauer und Fabrikant von Zungenstimmen in Göttingen. In Roland Behrens, Christoph Grohmann (ed.): Dulce Melos Organorum. Festschrift Alfred Reichling zum 70. Geburtstag (Veröffentlichung der Gesellschaft der Orgelfreunde. Vol. 200). Gesellschaft der Orgelfreunde, Mettlach 2005, .

 

German pipe organ builders
1812 births
1888 deaths
Businesspeople from Göttingen